The 2012 Gilbert mayoral election was held on August 28, 2012, to elect the mayor of Gilbert, Arizona. It saw the reelection of John Lewis.

Results

References 

2012
Gilbert
Gilbert
Events in Maricopa County, Arizona